John Arthur Leese (4 January 1930 – 23 September 1991) was a British newspaper editor.

Biography 

John Leese studied at Bishop Vesey's Grammar School. He edited the Coventry Evening Telegraph in the mid-1960s, then moved to London to work on the Evening News.  The paper closed in 1980, and Leese moved to New York City and produced the SoHo News for a year.

He returned to the UK to launch You magazine for the Mail on Sunday, then in 1986 became Editor of the Evening Standard. He resigned early in 1991 due to illness, and died in September of that year. His son, Mike Leese, was also a news editor at the Evening Standard.

References

1930 births
1991 deaths
English newspaper editors
English male journalists
London Evening Standard people
People educated at Bishop Vesey's Grammar School
Place of birth missing
English male non-fiction writers